Barón Rojo is a Spanish heavy metal band from Madrid that achieved international success in the 1980s. The band is led by siblings Carlos and Armando de Castro, previously from the band Coz, and is considered one of the most important representatives of Spanish hard rock. Barón Rojo in Spanish means "red baron", the name of the band being an homage to Manfred von Richthofen; the 1981 eponymous song "Barón Rojo" is about him. In 2017, they were ranked number 18 on Rolling Stone's "50 Greatest Spanish Rock Bands".

History

Early years, first album: 1980–81
Barón Rojo released their debut album, Larga Vida al Rock and Roll, in 1981, and the first single from the record was "Con Botas Sucias". The record achieved moderate success, earning them coverage from the media after winning Gold certification. To promote the album, Barón Rojo toured around Spain. This album heavily influenced the Spanish rock band Héroes del Silencio.

Two albums, global success: 1982–83
Barón Rojo moved to London for the recording of their second album, Volumen Brutal (1982), at Kingsway Studios, owned by Deep Purple frontman Ian Gillan. This album was released in two versions: one with the lyrics in Spanish and another sung in English. Bruce Dickinson from Iron Maiden is credited for helping them with the translation.

Volumen Brutal led the band to international success, especially in the UK, where they were featured on the cover of music magazine Kerrang! The album sold two million copies worldwide. It is considered one of the very best metal albums ever released in Spain, and one of the band's best releases.

On 27 August 1982, Barón Rojo played at the Reading music festival, along with renowned bands such as Iron Maiden, Twisted Sister, and Marillion.

In 1983, Metalmorfosis, their third studio album, also recorded in London, was released and contained, among many other tracks, the well-known ballad "Siempre estás allí". Together with Volumen Brutal, it is considered one of their best albums.

Fourth album, live releases, international tours: 1984–86
Following this, Barón Rojo released their fourth studio album, En un lugar de la marcha, in 1985, as well as two live albums, titled Barón al Rojo Vivo (1984) and Siempre Estás Allí (1986). Their international tours continued through Europe and Latin America; in 1984–1985, they had Metallica, at the time a relatively young band, open for them at a number of shows. As of 2018, the American band still played live cover versions of Barón Rojo songs.

Changing style, band tensions, fluctuating lineup: 1987–89
From then on, the band began experimenting with new musical elements, including orchestral compositions, as can be heard on their 1987 album, Tierra de Nadie, which includes their well-known song "Tierra de nadie". This album, the band's fifth, rounded out what are considered to be Barón Rojo's best releases. Meanwhile, the mood between band members, described by them as "pure hatred", kept on getting worse.

By the end of 1989, after they released their albums No va más and Obstinato, bassist/singer/composer José Luis Campuzano ("Sherpa") and drummer Hermes Calabria exited the band, leaving the De Castro brothers with an ever-changing lineup, with a turnover ranging from one to several years.

Further releases, legal disputes: 1992–2008
The album Desafío, released in 1992 and recorded in Madrid, was produced by guitarist Carlos de Castro, with Niko del Hierro on bass and José Antonio del Nogal playing drums.

After two compilation albums, the studio album Arma Secreta (1997), and legal disputes with their label (Zafiro) about royalties, BMG released a double compilation album called Cueste lo que cueste, which included 31 hits by the band plus four new songs.

2001 saw the release of the album 20+, an allusion to more than twenty years of existence, and in 2003, a covers album, Perversiones, was released, featuring  renditions of songs by artists including Deep Purple, Black Sabbath, Jimi Hendrix, Janis Joplin, and AC/DC.

Drummer Vale Rodríguez left the band in 2005 and was replaced by a returning José Martos.

In 2006, the band released Ultimasmentes, an album sung entirely by Carlos de Castro, except for the instrumental opening and finale.

Ángel Arias and José Martos left Barón Rojo in 2007, just after the live CD and DVD Desde Barón a Bilbao was released, and Tony Ferrer left the band in September 2008. He was replaced by former Ñu bassist Gorka Alegre.

Reunions, final album, documentary film, breakup: 2009–2021
Barón Rojo held a reunion concert on 20 June 2009 at the Metalway music festival in Zaragoza in their original formation, including José Luís Campuzano on vocals. That same year, they released the live album En Clave de Rock. After this successful concert, they reunited again for a tour, starting and finishing in Madrid, with the first concert being held at "La Riviera" on 30 January 2010 and the last at the former bullring "Palacio de Vistalegre" on 22 October 2011, where they announced the filming of a Barón Rojo documentary.
The film was released in 2012. The same year, they also released their latest studio album, titled Tommy Barón, a cover album of Tommy featuring Spanish musician Eva Amaral. In 2020, on their 40th anniversary, Barón Rojo decided to finally disband. However, due to the COVID-19 pandemic, their final tour was postponed and as such, their farewell concert rescheduled to December 2021. It featured guest appearances by artists such as Graham Bonnet, Mel Collins, Jørn Lande and Aurora Beltrán.

Band members

Current
 Carlos de Castro – vocals, guitar (1980–present)
 Armando de Castro – guitar, vocals (1980–present)
 Rafa Díaz – drums (2007–present)
 José Luis Morán – bass (2020–present)

Past
 José Luis Campuzano ("Sherpa") – bass, vocals (1980–1989, 2009–2011)
 Hermes Calabria – drums (1980–1989, 2009–2011)
 Máximo González – vocals (1991)
 Pepe Bao – bass (1990–1991)
 José Antonio del Nogal ("Kamakhan") – drums (1991–1995)
 Niko del Hierro – bass (1991–1992)
 José Luis Aragón – bass (1993–1995)
 Valeriano Rodríguez – drums (1998–2005)
 José Martos – drums (1996–1998, 2005-2007)
 Angel Arias – bass (1995–2007, 2016–2017)
 Tony Ferrer – bass (2007–2008)
 Gorka Alegre – bass (2008–2015)
 Óscar Cuenca – bass (2015–2016)
 Javier Rodríguez – bass (2017–2020)

Timeline

Discography

Studio albums
 Larga vida al Rock and Roll (1981)
 Volumen brutal (1982)
 Metalmorfosis (1983)
 En un lugar de la marcha (1985)
 Tierra de nadie (1987)
 No va más! (1988)
 Obstinato (1989)
 Desafío (1992)
 Arma secreta (1997)
 20+ (2001)
 Perversiones (2003)
 Ultimasmentes (2006)
 Tommy Barón (2012)

Live albums
 Barón al rojo vivo (1984)
 Siempre estáis allí (1986)
 Barón en Aqualung (2002)
 Desde Barón a Bilbao (2007)
 En Clave de Rock (with the Mislata symphony orchestra) (2009)

Compilations
 Larga vida al Barón (1995)
 Cueste lo que cueste (1999)
 Las aventuras del Barón (2006)

DVDs
 Barón en Divino (2002)
 El Rock de nuestra transición Barón - Obús - Asfalto (2004)
 Desde Barón a Bilbao (2007)
 Barón Rojo 30 Aniversario (2010)

References

External links

 
 

Musical groups from Madrid
Spanish heavy metal musical groups
Musical quartets
Rock en Español music groups
Musical groups established in 1980
Locomotive Music artists
Cultural depictions of Manfred von Richthofen